Osprey Packs, Inc, commonly known as Osprey is an American brand that manufactures outdoor backpacks. It was founded in 1974 by Mike Pfotenhauer. It was purchased by Helen of Troy Limited in 2021 for $414.7 million.

History 

Mike Pfotenhauer, Osprey's founder, and his wife Diane Wren, originally founded Osprey as Santa Cruz Recreational Packs in 1974. It was headquartered in Santa Cruz, California where they would build custom fitted packs for backpacking. In 1990, the company moved to Dolores, Colorado. At this point 90% of their workforce was made up of Navajos. In 1994 the company would move production from Dolores to Cortez, Colorado. In 1999 the company would move all operations from Dolores to Cortez. On the June 18, 2001 edition of Time magazine the Osprey Aether 60 is shown on the cover, worn by blind climber Erik Weihenmayer. He was the first blind climber to summit Everest. By 2001 Osprey had 92 employees including manufacturing staff. In 2002, production started to be outsourced to Korea and Vietnam in order to meet demand and lower production costs. At the time, labor costs in Vietnam were 90% lower than in the US. "We had to lower our cost of production," said Tom Barney, Osprey's CEO at the time. The company kept one Navajo sewer in Cortez to perform warranty  repairs. They were the last major US backpack maker to move production overseas. In 2014, the Cortez warehouse was turned into their warranty repair facility. A distribution warehouse in Ogden, Utah would be opened to replace the Cortez warehouse. In 2015, a headquarters for Osprey Europe would be established in Poole. It was reported that in 2021 Osprey had about 300 employees, and would generate $155–160 million that year. In 2021, Osprey was sold to Helen of Troy Limited for $414 million. In 2022 the Osprey Unltd line was released. It retailed for $700, and had features such as a patented 3D printed back padding.

Advocacy 
Osprey participates in a number of charitable works. Every year, a member of its staff is supported in a fundraising event for the Breast Cancer Prevention Partners "Climb Against The Odds" event. The participant raises $6,000 for cancer research and they climb Mount Shasta. Osprey also donates backpacks for the event. In 2021, Osprey supported 90 organizations throughout the world. In 2021, they also donated over $32,000 in cash and over $51,000 in products.

In 2017, Osprey advocated to keep Bears Ears National Monument at its size, instead of a reduction of size proposed by Utah Governor Gary Herbert. As a result of the legislation, Osprey and other outdoor companies pulled out a twice-yearly trade show from Salt Lake City.

References 

American companies established in 1974